Imiloxan is a drug which is used in scientific research. It acts as a selective antagonist for the α2B adrenergic receptor, and has been useful for distinguishing the actions of the different α2 adrenergic subtypes.

Synthesis

The imidazole portion of imiloxan is prepared by the reaction of an imidate with the diethyl acetal of aminoacetaldehyde. N-Alkylation of the imidazole with ethyl iodide gives imiloxan.

References

External links 

Imidazolines
Alpha blockers
Benzodioxans